"Something So Right" is a song by the American singer-songwriter Paul Simon. It is the fourth song on his third studio album, There Goes Rhymin' Simon (1973). Although it was not a single, it was released as a B-side of a number of singles, including "Take Me to the Mardi Gras" and "Slip Slidin' Away".

The song has been covered by numerous artists, most notably by British singer Annie Lennox, whose 1995 duet with Simon placed at number 44 on the UK Singles Chart.

Personnel
Credits adapted from the liner notes of There Goes Rhymin' Simon.

Paul Simon – vocals, guitar, songwriting, production
David Spinozza – guitar
Al Gafa – guitar
Richard Davis – acoustic bass
Bob Cranshaw – electric bass

Grady Tate – drums
Bob James – Fender Rhodes 
Bobby Scott – piano
Don Elliott – vibraphone
Quincy Jones – string arrangement
Phil Ramone – audio engineer
A flute is also audible on the song, but the player is uncredited.

Charts 
Paul Simon version

Annie Lennox version 

In 1995, the song was recorded by British singer Annie Lennox for her album Medusa. Later that year, Lennox re-recorded the track as a duet with Paul Simon, and it was released as a single, reaching no. 44 on the UK charts.

Track listing

CD Maxi Single

CD Single

Charts
Annie Lennox version

References

1973 songs
1995 singles
Annie Lennox songs
Columbia Records singles
Paul Simon songs
RCA Records singles
Song recordings produced by Paul Simon
Song recordings produced by Phil Ramone
Songs written by Paul Simon